The Cherry cannon (Bulgarian: Черешово топче, ; Macedonian: Црешево топче) is a wooden cannon, artillery weapon the body of which is made entirely of acacia or cherry. It has no significant combat value, as the wood shatters under explosion after only a few shots. It was first used by Bulgarian anti-Ottoman revolutionaries in the April Uprising. It was used to arm the under-equipped Bulgarian rebels against the Ottoman army. Balance scale masses and pieces of metal were used as ammunition for the cherry cannon. The first cherry guns were created in the spring of 1876. Later cherry guns were used in the Kruševo Republic and at other places of insurgency during the Ilinden–Preobrazhenie Uprising in 1903. 

The only original cherry cannon from the April Uprising of 1876 is kept in the museum of Bratsigovo, Bulgaria. The only cherry cannon that survived the Ilinden–Preobrazhenie Uprising is the one captured in 1903 by the Ottoman army after the battle with the insurgents near Kruševo, after an entire insurgent company died defending the concession in the escape of the population from Kruševo. That cherry cannon was then transferred by the Turks to the Istanbul Military Museum. In 2003, on the occasion of the 100th anniversary of the Ilinden Uprising, the cherry cannon from the museum in Istanbul was loaned for three months for an exhibition in the Museum of North Macedonia.

Sources

References

April Uprising of 1876
Macedonia under the Ottoman Empire